Robert Ascroft, JP. MP, (1847 – 19 June 1899) was a prominent Lancashire solicitor and an English politician. He entered the House of Commons on 13 July 1895 and was one of the two Members of Parliament for Oldham between 1895 until his death, as a member of the Conservative Party. He was known as the "Workers' Friend" and after his death, a public subscription enabled a statue of him to be erected in Alexandra Park, Oldham.

Robert Ascroft is mentioned in Chapter XVII of Sir Winston Churchill's book 'My Early Life'. In the seventeenth chapter, entitled 'Oldham', Mr Churchill recalls the day where Mr Ascroft, MP for Oldham, talked to him about running the constituency together. Oldham was a two-member constituency and evidently, Mr Ascroft believed the young Winston -a war hero and celebrity- was ripe for the job.

References

External links 
 

1847 births
1899 deaths
Conservative Party (UK) MPs for English constituencies
UK MPs 1895–1900
Politics of the Metropolitan Borough of Oldham
Members of the Parliament of the United Kingdom for constituencies in Lancashire